Mohammed Hussein Al Shaali is the former Minister of State for Foreign Affairs of the United Arab Emirates. 

Al Shaali was born in 1950.

He obtained his bachelor's degree in management and economy from Beirut Arab University before joining the Foreign Ministry, where he was Director of Arab World Department (1982–1985), ambassador to the UN and non-resident ambassador to Canada (1986–1987) where he also acted as the country's representative to the Security Council. From 1992 to 1999, he was ambassador to the US, and was later assigned as UAE Permanent Representative to the UN European Headquarters in Geneva.

Personal life
Al Shaali is married and father of 7.

References

Living people
1950 births
Emirati diplomats
Emirati politicians
Ambassadors of the United Arab Emirates to Canada
Ambassadors of the United Arab Emirates to the United States
Permanent Representatives of the United Arab Emirates to the United Nations
Beirut Arab University alumni